Mols railway station was a railway station in Quarten, in the Swiss canton of St. Gallen. It is an intermediate stop on the Ziegelbrücke–Sargans line. The station was closed on 12 December 2021, because of ongoing construction work on the Bommerstein tunnel and low ridership. Buses continue to stop at the station.

Layout and connections 
Mols had a  island platform with two tracks ( 1–2).  operates bus services from the station to Walenstadt and Flums. Schiffsbetrieb Walensee operates ferries on the Walensee from a ferry dock adjacent to the former station.

References

External links 
 

Railway stations in the canton of St. Gallen
Disused railway stations in Switzerland
Swiss Federal Railways stations
Railway stations closed in 2021